Fireworks is a South Korean teledrama produced and broadcast by SBS from 2 February to 18 May 2000.

Story

Cast
 Lee Young-ae as Kim Ji-hyun 
 Lee Geung-young as Lee Kang-wook
 Cha In-pyo as Choi Jong-hyuk
 Jo Min-su as Huh Min-kyung
 Jang Seo-hee as Na Hyun-kyung
 Kim Na-woon as So Yoo-ja
 Jung Hye-sun as Ji-hyun's mother
 Baek Il-seob as Ji-hyun's father
 Seo Woo-rim as Madam Seo
 Kang Boo-ja as Madam Noh
 Park Geun-hyung as Choi Chang-soon
 Kim Bok-hee as Kang-wook's mother
 Shin Choong-sik as Kang-wook's father
 Kim Hae-sook as Min-kyung's aunt
 Choi Sang-hoon as Lee Kang-shik
 Yang Mi-kyung as Cho-hee
 Song Sun-mi as Heo Min-ji
 Maeng Sang-hoon as Coach Jung
 Won Ki-joon as Park Han-soo
 Song Young-chang
 Choi Soo-rin
 Kim Min-sang
 Lee Jong-rae
 Yoo Ji-yun

External links
 Fireworks Info
 SBS Fireworks Official Website

Seoul Broadcasting System television dramas
2000 South Korean television series debuts
2000 South Korean television series endings
Korean-language television shows
Television shows written by Kim Soo-hyun (writer)
South Korean romance television series